= Sky villa =

A sky villa is a housing concept which brings together the designs of villas and apartments into a single construct. It is a large apartment spanning an entire floor of an apartment building (or even two or more floors). Typically considered in the premium or luxury category of real estate around the globe, sky villas bring together living in a wide home space with the security and amenities of living in an apartment. An example of the luxury class of a sky villa is the single two floor sky villa suite of the Palms Casino Resort's fantasy tower, which is billed at US$35,487 per night, ranking it at number five among the world's 15 most expensive suites.

Sky villas today typically come with a heavy price tag and numerous amenities, which include having a butler and five-star chef on premises. Sky Villas are designed for exclusivity and extreme comfort for the residents, therefore are not easily affordable. It differs from penthouses, where the luxury amenities are limited only to the residents of the penthouse. In a sky villa, every resident has access to luxury amenities, along with privacy and security.

== Sky villas worldwide ==
Below are sky villas or buildings that have sky villas around the world:

- Fantasy Tower of Palms Casino Resort - Las Vegas, Nevada
- Honolulu Sky Villa - Honolulu, Hawai
- Gables by the Bay - Goa, India
- SKYDHAM Sky Villas - Mumbai, India
- Sathorn Sky Villas - Bangkok, Thailand
- Azalea – Skyvillas - Thrissur, Kerala, India
- Olympia Opaline Skyvilla, Navalur, Chennai- India
- 81 Aureate, Bandra West, Mumbai - India
- Bhandary Vertica, Kadri, Mangalore - India
- Citadel Callista Sky Villa, Kadri, Mangalore - India
- Regent Residences, Singapore
